The Venus figurines of Kostenki are prehistoric representations of the female body, usually in ivory and usually dated to between 25,000 and 20,000 years ago, making them part of the Gravettian industry of the Upper Palaeolithic period. Found in the Kostyonki-Borshchyovo archeological complex in Russia, these Venus figurines are now in the Hermitage Museum.

References

Further reading

External links 

 Venus of Kostenky, Encyclopedia of Stone Age Art
 Venus figures from the Kostenki–Borshevo region on the Don River, Don's Maps

Sculptures of the Hermitage Museum
Archaeological collections of the Hermitage Museum
Kostenki
Archaeological discoveries in Russia
Gravettian
Ivory works of art